Adolf Hirner (born 3 May 1965) is an Austrian former ski jumper.

References

1965 births
Living people
Austrian male ski jumpers
Place of birth missing (living people)
20th-century Austrian people